Blitz Week was a period of United States Army Air Forces (USAAF) aerial bombardment during the 1943 Combined Bomber Offensive of World War II. Air raids were conducted on six of seven days as part of Operation Gomorrah, against targets such as the chemical plant at Herøya, Norway, which produced nitrates for explosives; and the AGO Flugzeugwerke AG plant (an Operation Pointblank target) at Oschersleben, Germany that assembled Focke-Wulf 190s. The Kassel mission on July 28, 1943, was the first use of P-47 Thunderbolt auxiliary fuel tanks.

Attack on Norway 

Norway was an important foothold for Germany due to strategic positioning and its connection to Swedish iron mines, connecting Lulea, Sweden to Narvik, Norway. On July 24, Trondheim and Herøya in Norway were attacked by the Eighth Air Force in their very first attack on Norway and delivered a substantial amount of damage. Trondheim was home to a large U-boat base and Herøya sheltered a nitrate processing plant owned by German I. G. Fabenindustrie. The attack on the processing plant had struck a great blow to the German's air force, and forcing them to find a new supplier for metal. The Eighth Air Force had brought along 167 1st Heavy Bombardment Wing B-17s, a single YB-40, and 41 4th Heavy Bombardment Wing long-range B-17s. The attack on Norway was also the first time a splasher beacon was used against poor weather.

Bombing of Hamburg 

During the last week of July in 1943, The Eighth Air Force of the United States Army Air Forces(USAAF) launched an offensive against Germany in the form of air raids in which 1,000 combatants were either killed, injured, or went missing. The United States of America launched these air raids alongside the United Kingdom, which they called Operation Gomorrah. Hamburg was deemed an important strategic target due to its housing of U-boats and oil refineries in the region. Because the Nazis knew and understood the importance of Hamburg, the city was ringed with anti-aircraft weapons and 1,700 shelters were provided for its 230,000 citizens. To counter the radar use in Hamburg, British bomber crews applied strips of tin foil, known as Chaff, to the bomber which would be dropped to confuse the radar screen and would appear as a cluster of targets on the screen. Britain's first attack came on the 24th, with the USAAF to follow the next day, but they ran into difficulties navigating the city due to the large amount of smoke the RAF had caused on the night before.

Operation Pointblank 
Operation Pointblank was the code name for the main part of the Combined Bomber Offensive and was focused on crippling Nazi Germany's aircraft production to create less resistance when invading the rest of Europe controlled by Germany. Operation Pointblank had begun on 14 June in 1943 and lasted until 19 April the next year. The USAAF had focused on attacking aircraft producing factories during the day in their "precision attacks" and had forced the Luftwaffe into defending the factories, creating large air battles and even though German aircraft production rose due to the defense, the strength of the Luftwaf fe had been reduced. During Operation Pointblank, both the USAAF and RAF had attacked several targets including: Shweinfurt, Regensburg, Oshersleben, Warnemünde, and  Kassel.

Oshersleben 
During the last week of July in 1943, the Eighth Air Force had launched several high effort missions against aircraft production factories in Germany. General Ira C. Eaker and Fred Anderson were crucial in the planning of these attacks and had focused on the northern part of Germany where the Eighth Air Force had routinely operated. The factories that were targeted were the AGO Flugzeugwerke located in Oshersleben, Heinkel Flugzeugwerke in Warnemünde, and Fieseler Flugzeugbau in Kassel. These factories produced the notable fighter planes Focke-Wulf Fw 190 and the Messerschmitt Bf 109. The attack began on 28 July and the 120 B-17s from the 4th wing had set out for Oshersleben but had soon run into poor weather and became separated.

Notes

World War II strategic bombing